Gomaringen is a municipality located about 10 km south of Tübingen in the German state of Baden-Württemberg.

Geography

Geographical Position
Gomaringen is located in the valley of the stream Wiesaz, a tributary of the Steinlach, which in turn flows into the Neckar.

Neighboring municipalities
The following cities and Municipalities border Gomaringen in clockwise order starting from the north. They belong to District of Tübingen or to District of Reutlingen.
Kusterdingen
Reutlingen (Reutlingen District)
Mössingen
Nehren
Dußlingen
Tübingen

Formation of the municipality
The settlements Hinterweiler and Stockach belong to the municipality of Gomaringen.

History
 The ending of the name "ingen" is proof for the first settlement done by the Alamanni
 The name "Gomaringen" is first mentioned in a document in 1191, the chronicle of Berthold von Zwiefalten.
 Werner von Gomaringen (approx. 1356-1393) and Peter von Gomaringen (1393-1412) belonging to the house of the Herren von Gomaringen become abbots of Bebenhausen, the domestical monastery of the Pfalzgrafen von Tübingen.
 1499: Gomaringen and its contemporary settlements Hinterweiler und Stockach are bought by Reutlingen. For a 150-year-long era reeves take care of the interests of the imperial city.
 1648: Because of the high contributions in the Thirty Years War Reutlingen had to pay as an imperial city, it needed to sell Gomaringen and Hinterweiler to Württemberg.
 1807: Gomaringen becomes member of the Oberamt, later the district Reutlingen.
 1973: As a result of the district reformation in 1973, the municipality changed districts, from Reutlingen to Tübingen.

Politics
Gomaringen is the seat of the municipal administration cooperation "Steinlach-Wiesaz". Other members are Dußlingen and Nehren.

Town Council
The last town election on 7 June 2009 had the following results at the last reapportionment:
FWV - 7 seats
SPD - 4 seats
CDU - 4 seats
Grüne Liste - 3 seats

International town partnership
 Arcis-sur-Aube in France, since 1976

Culture

Museums
 Gustav-Schwab-Museum inside the castle palace

Castles
 Castle Gomaringen, started 1837 finished 1841, was the home of Gustav Schwab.

Economy and infrastructure

Traffic
The state road L 230 links the town to the federal road B 27 and thereby to  Tübingen and Stuttgart. The state road L 394 links Gomaringen east-bound to Reutlingen. The state road L 384 provides the link from Gomaringen to the Schwaebische Alb.

Public transport is provided by Verkehrsverbund Neckar-Alb-Donau (NALDO). The town is in comb no. 113.

References

External links
 Official Internet site of the municipality

Tübingen (district)